Matteo Gianello (born 7 May 1976) is an Italian former footballer who played as a goalkeeper. In 2012, he was charged with match fixing during his time at Napoli, regarding matches played in 2010.

He originally came from Bovolone, Italy.

He was part of the team that brought Napoli from Serie C back to Serie A.

In 2013, his ban from professional football was reduced from 3 years and 3 months to 1 year and 9 months.

References

External links
Player profile on Napoli's official website

1976 births
Living people
People from Bovolone
Italian footballers
A.C. ChievoVerona players
Hellas Verona F.C. players
U.C. Sampdoria players
A.C.N. Siena 1904 players
S.S.C. Napoli players
Serie A players
Serie B players

Association football goalkeepers
Mediterranean Games gold medalists for Italy
Mediterranean Games medalists in football
Competitors at the 1997 Mediterranean Games
Sportspeople from the Province of Verona
Footballers from Veneto